Conchita Martínez was the four-time defending champion but lost in the final to Mary Pierce, 6–4, 6–0.

Seeds
A champion seed is indicated in bold text while text in italics indicates the round in which that seed was eliminated. The top eight seeds received a bye to the second round.

  Monica Seles (third round)
  Arantxa Sánchez Vicario (quarterfinals)
  Conchita Martínez (final)
  Anke Huber (second round)
  Iva Majoli (third round)
  Amanda Coetzer (third round)
  Irina Spîrlea (quarterfinals)
  Karina Habšudová (third round)
  Brenda Schultz-McCarthy (second round)
  Mary Pierce (champion)
  Barbara Paulus (semifinals)
  Elena Likhovtseva (third round)
  Sabine Appelmans (third round)
  Ruxandra Dragomir (quarterfinals)
  Nathalie Tauziat (second round)
  Sandrine Testud (second round)

Draw

Finals

Top half

Section 1

Section 2

Bottom half

Section 3

Section 4

References
 1997 Italian Open Draw

Women's Singles
Singles